Mel's may refer to:

 Mel's Diner, the setting for the 1976–1985 TV series Alice
 Mel's Drive-In, a restaurant chain
 Mel's Hole, an urban legend about a geographic anomaly

See also 

 
 Mel (disambiguation)
 MEL (disambiguation)
 Mells (disambiguation)
 Mels
 St. Mel's